Sixth Avenue – also known as Avenue of the Americas, although this name is seldom used by New Yorkers – is a major thoroughfare in New York City's borough of Manhattan, on which traffic runs northbound, or "uptown". It is commercial for much of its length.

Sixth Avenue begins four blocks below Canal Street, at Franklin Street in TriBeCa, where the northbound Church Street divides into Sixth Avenue to the left and the local continuation of Church Street to the right, which then ends at Canal Street. From this beginning, Sixth Avenue traverses SoHo and Greenwich Village, roughly divides Chelsea from the Flatiron District and NoMad, passes through the Garment District and skirts the edge of the Theater District while passing through Midtown Manhattan.

Sixth Avenue's northern end is at Central Park South, adjacent to the Artists' Gate entrance to Central Park via Center Drive. Historically, Sixth Avenue was also the name of the road that continued north of Central Park, but that segment was renamed Lenox Avenue in 1887 and co-named Malcolm X Boulevard in 1987.

History

Sixth Avenue was laid out in the Commissioners' Plan of 1811. As originally designed, Sixth Avenue's southern terminus was at Carmine Street in Greenwich Village, and it continued northward to 147th Street in Harlem. Central Park was added to the street grid in 1857, and created an interruption in Sixth Avenue between 59th and 110th Streets. Proposals to extend the street south of Carmine Street were discussed by the city's Board of Aldermen as early as the mid-1860s. The IRT Sixth Avenue Line elevated railway (the "El") was constructed on Sixth Avenue in 1878, darkening the street and reducing its real-estate value. In the early and mid 1800s Sixth Avenue passed by the popular roadhouse and tavern, Old Grapevine, at the corner of 11th Street, which at the time was the northern edge of the city.

In late 1887, the Harlem portion of what was then considered Sixth Avenue was renamed Lenox Avenue for philanthropist James Lenox; it was later co-named Malcolm X Boulevard, in honor of the slain civil rights leader, a century later.

Starting in 1926, as part of the construction of the Holland Tunnel, Sixth Avenue was widened and extended from Minetta Lane to Canal Street. Smaller side streets in the extension's path were also demolished or incorporated into the extended avenue. The Sixth Avenue extension also allowed for the construction of the Independent Subway System (IND)'s Eighth Avenue line, which was to run below Sixth Avenue south of Eighth Street. To accommodate the new subway, buildings were condemned and demolished to extend Sixth Avenue southward. Construction of the extension resulted in considerable dislocation to existing residents, as ten thousand people were evicted to make way for the Sixth Avenue extension. One historian stated that most of the displaced residents were "Italian immigrants who knew no other home in America". According to the WPA Guide to New York City, the extension resulted in blank side walls facing the "uninspiring thoroughfare" and small leftover spaces. Dozens of buildings, including the original Church of Our Lady of Pompeii, were demolished. After the renumbering of the street's properties in 1929, the Sixth Avenue extension was opened to traffic in 1930, and the subway line was completed two years later. Sixth Avenue, the only numbered avenue to extend south of Houston Street, thus became the southernmost numbered avenue in Manhattan. House numbering of existing buildings was adjusted.

By the 1930s, a coalition of commercial establishments and building owners along Sixth Avenue campaigned to have the El removed. The El was closed on December 4, 1938, and came down in stages, beginning in Greenwich Village in 1938–39. The replacement Sixth Avenue subway, which ran between Houston and 53rd Streets with a transfer to the Eighth Avenue line at West Fourth Street, opened in 1940.

The demolition of the Sixth Avenue elevated railway also resulted in accelerated commercial development of the avenue in Midtown. Beginning in the 1960s, the avenue was entirely rebuilt above 42nd Street as an all-but-uninterrupted avenue of corporate headquarters housed in glass slab towers of International Modernist style. Among the buildings constructed was the CBS Building at 52nd Street, by Eero Saarinen (1965), dubbed "Black Rock" for its full-height black-granite piers; this designated landmark is Saarinen's only skyscraper. Another group of modernist structures along Sixth Avenue in midtown was the "XYZ Buildings" (1971–1974) at 1211, 1221, and 1251 Sixth Avenue.

On March 10, 1957, Sixth Avenue was reconfigured to carry one-way traffic north of its intersection with Broadway in Herald Square. The rest of the avenue followed on November 10, 1963.

In the mid-1970s, the city "spruced up" the street, including the addition of patterned brick crosswalks, repainting of streetlamps, and new pedestrian plazas. Special lighting, rare throughout the rest of the city, was also installed.

Renaming and co-naming

The avenue's official name was changed to Avenue of the Americas in 1945 by the City Council, at the behest of Mayor Fiorello La Guardia, who signed the bill into law on October 2, 1945. The intent was to honor "Pan-American ideals and principles" and the nations of Central and South America, and to encourage those countries to build consulates along the avenue. It was felt at the time that the name would provide greater grandeur to a shabby street, and to promote trade with the Western Hemisphere.

After the name change, round signs were attached to streetlights on the avenue, showing the national seals and coats of arms of the nations honored. However, New Yorkers rarely used the avenue's newer name, and in 1955, an informal study found that locals used "Sixth Avenue" more than eight times as often as "Avenue of the Americas". The move was also criticized as "propaganda" by those who wanted to return to the original name. Since then, the thoroughfare has been labelled as both "Avenue of the Americas" and "Sixth Avenue" in recent years. Most of the old round signs with country emblems were gone by the late 1990s, and the ones remaining, which were only present between Canal Street and Washington Place in Greenwich Village and in Midtown around 57th Street began showing signs of age. However, starting in March 2023, the city began to install new signs along most of the length of the avenue, in addition to replacing the remaining original signs, which were aging.

Notable buildings and events

Sights along Sixth Avenue include Juan Pablo Duarte Square; with the polychrome High Victorian Gothic Jefferson Market Courthouse, currently occupied by the Jefferson Market Library; the surviving stretch of grand department stores of 1880 to 1900 in the Ladies' Mile Historic District that runs from 18th Street to 23rd Street; the former wholesale flower district; Herald Square at 34th Street, site of Macy's department store; Bryant Park from 40th to 42nd Streets; and the corporate stretch above 42nd Street, which includes the Bank of America Tower, W. R. Grace Building, International Center of Photography, Rockefeller Center — including the Time-Life Building, News Corp. Building, Exxon Building and McGraw-Hill Building, as well as Radio City Music Hall. The Steinway Hall of New York was moved to 1133 Sixth Avenue in 2016.

Sixth Avenue is the site of the annual Village Halloween Parade in Greenwich Village and the Dominican Day Parade in Midtown.

Mass transit
Sixth Avenue is served by the New York City Subway with the IND Sixth Avenue Line north of Houston Street, and the IND Eighth Avenue Line south of Greenwich Avenue. The Harlem portion of Sixth Avenue (Lenox Avenue) is served by the IRT Lenox Avenue Line north of Central Park North (110th Street). The PATH's Uptown Hudson Tubes to New Jersey also run under Sixth Avenue (JSQ–33, HOB-33, and JSQ-33 (via HOB) trains) from 9th to 33rd Streets.

In popular culture
The avenue is referenced both in the name and in the lyrics of "6th Avenue Heartache" by The Wallflowers.

See also 
 6½ Avenue

References

External links

New York Songlines: Sixth Avenue – a virtual walking tour

 
06
Greenwich Village
West Village
SoHo, Manhattan
Tribeca
Chelsea, Manhattan
Midtown Manhattan